KDUK-FM (104.7 MHz) is a commercial Top 40 (CHR) music radio station in Eugene, Oregon (licensed to Florence) that serves the Eugene–Springfield, Corvallis–Albany–Lebanon, and Salem areas of the Willamette Valley.

The station focuses strongly on today's hits, but occasionally plays songs dating back as far as the early 1990s. KDUK-FM plays these “old school” hits every weekday during the noon hour in a segment they call the Old School Lunch.

History
KDUK has spent the vast majority of its years as a CHR/Top 40 station.  In its early years, it had a hot adult contemporary format as "K-Duck FM 105" before changing to classic rock “Classics 104.7” in late 1987.  KLCX (also known as "The X") was a classic rock station until early 1993, when 104.7 returned to pop music as CHR/Top 40, and the KDUK call letters.  In 1993 (when the CHR/Top 40 format debuted), it was branded “Power 104.7 K-D-U-K” which evolved into its current branding; “104.7 K-Duck” by 1995.

References

External links
KDUK official website

DUK
Contemporary hit radio stations in the United States
1983 establishments in Oregon
Radio stations established in 1983